The 1993 Honduran Cup was the fourth Honduran football cup. This season Real Maya lift the trophy for the first time after beating Motagua in the final match.

First round

Group A

Standings

Group B

Standings

Final round

Semifinals

 Real Maya won 3–2 on aggregate.

 Motagua won 3–1 on aggregate.

Final

 Real Maya won 5–3 on aggregate.

Known results

Honduran Cup seasons
Cup